Admiral Walter Cleveland Cowles (July 11, 1853 – November 27, 1917) was an admiral in the United States Navy. He served as commander in chief of the U.S. Pacific Fleet and commander in chief of the U.S. Asiatic Fleet.

Biography
Born in Connecticut, Cowles entered the U.S. Naval Academy at the age of sixteen, graduating in 1873. As captain of USS Kentucky (BB-6), he sailed around the world with the Great White Fleet in 1908–1909. He commanded the U.S. Pacific Fleet from 1913 to 1914 and the U.S. Asiatic Fleet from 1914 to 1915.

In March 1915, Cowles became one of the first full admirals in the history of the U.S. Navy when the three commanders in chief of the Atlantic, Pacific, and Asiatic Fleets were all advanced to the temporary rank of full admiral while so serving. Upon relinquishing command of the Asiatic Fleet in June 1915, Cowles reverted to his permanent rank of rear admiral.

Cowles retired in August 1915. He died in Redlands, California, on November 27, 1917.

Dates of rank

Midshipman – May 1873
Ensign – July 1874
Master – August 1879
Lieutenant, junior grade – March 1883
Lieutenant – December 1885
Lieutenant commander – unknown
Commander – unknown
Captain – unknown
Rear admiral – 1911
Admiral – March 10, 1915

References 

The Captains of the Great White Fleet

United States Naval Academy alumni
United States Navy admirals
1853 births
1917 deaths
People from Farmington, Connecticut